Lincoln is the name of a huge giant sequoia located in Giant Forest in Sequoia National Park. It is currently considered by many to be the fourth largest tree in the world.

Description
Lincoln features an irregular base with prominent burn scars on its northern, southern, and western faces. A small white burl can be seen on its northeastern face. The top of Lincoln appears bleached with many large branches pointing outward.

Dimensions
Wendell Flint was somewhat critical of the earlier measurements and he stated that he thought that it was appropriate to exclude a portion of the irregular base of the tree from his volume calculations, which in addition to some extrapolation differences from the earlier measurements, explains the smaller volume of  that he obtained compared to the earlier figure. Although he chose to exclude it, Flint stated that the excluded portion of the base could just as easily be included in the calculations, presumably leading to the alternative volume of  The Lincoln Tree has a maximum base diameter of 36.4 feet.

See also
 List of largest giant sequoias
 List of individual trees

References

Individual giant sequoia trees
Sequoia National Park